Falnir is an upscale commercial and residential locality in Mangalore city, Karnataka, India.

Roads 
Some of the roads at Falnir are
 Sturrock Road
 Mother Theresa Road
 Silva Lane Road
 Coelho Lane Road

Buildings 
Some of the buildings at Falnir are
 Ivory towers
 Shalimar heights apartments
 St. Mary's High School
 Ilfa Heights apartment
 Apple Mart
 Employees' Provident Fund Organization (EPFO) office
 Casa De Coelho apartment

Noel Mathias Park 
Noel Mathias Park is a recreation park at Falnir.

See also
 Pandeshwar
 Vas lane

References

Localities in Mangalore